Paul Nooncree Hasluck was an Anglo-Australian writer and editor. He was born in Australia in April 1854 but moved to the UK before 1881, and lived there till his death in London on 7 May 1931. He wrote about technical subjects and was a pioneer in the "do-it-yourself" category.

Hasluck was the editor of Work (1892–1909) and Building World, (1895–1909), as well as being secretary of the Institution of Sanitary Engineers and a fellow of the Institute of Journalists.

Family
Hasluck married in 1883 Florence née Sparrow, who died in 1916. By her he had two sons. At some point prior to the publication in 1881 of Lathe-work: A Practical Treatise on the Tools, Appliances, and Processes Employed in the Art of Turning he moved to England, where at the time of his death, he maintained two residences: at 97 Loughborough Park, Brixton, and at Coopers Hill, Herne Bay.

Works authored
 Microscopes and Accessories, How To Make and Use Them, published by Cassell and Company as part of "Work Handbooks" series, Preface dated 1905
 Rustic Carpentry
 The Metal Turner's Handybook
 Electric Bells: How To Make And Fit Them"
 Lathe-work Practical Gas Fitting Mounting and Framing Pictures Practical Draughtsmen's Work Road and Footpath Construction Bookbinding Motor Bicycle Building Leather Working Practical Graining and Marbling The Wood Turner's Handybook Cabinetwork and Joinery Iron, Steel, and Fireproof Construction Practical Plumbers' Work Violins and Other Stringed Instruments - How To Make Them Basket Work of All Kinds Tinplate Work Upholstery Textile Fabrics and Their Preparation for Dyeing Taxidermy Bamboo Work The Mechanic's Workshop Handybook Painters' Oils, Colours and Varnishes Saddlery 
 Practical Staircase Joinery The Automobile: A Practical Treatise The Model Engineer's Handybook House Decoration Dynamos and Electric Motors Wood Finishing: Comprising Staining, Varnishing and Polishing The Clock Jobber's Handybook Colouring Matters for Dyeing Textiles 
 Cycle Building and Repairing The Pattern Maker's Handybook Smith's work Sanitary Construction in Building Electro-plating Harness Making Beehives and Beekeepers' Appliances Lens Grinding & Mirrors for Astronomical TelescopesWorks edited
 Photographic Chemistry Manual of Traditional Wood Carving Cassell's Cyclopedia of Mechanics Cassell's Carpentry and Joinery''

References

1854 births
1931 deaths
Australian non-fiction writers
Do it yourself